Betong may refer to:

 Places in Sarawak, Malaysia:
 Betong, Sarawak (town)
 Betong Division
 Betong (federal constituency), represented in the Dewan Rakyat
 Places in Yala Province, Thailand
 Betong, Thailand – Town
 Betong district – Thailand (amphoe)
 Betong Sumaya – Filipino comedian

See also
 Bettong – any of several species of the genus Bettongia, sometimes referred to as rat-kangaroos